Shadow World Master Atlas is a supplement published by Iron Crown Enterprises (I.C.E.) in 1989 for the fantasy role-playing game Rolemaster.

Contents
Shadow World Master Atlas is a campaign setting describing the world of Kulthea, the Shadow World. The boxed set contains 
 64-page book, "Master Atlas, Volume I", containing maps and details of various places
 64-page book, "Master Atlas, Volume II", containing details of the main races of Kulthea
 32-page book, "Atlas Addendum", containing information about monsters, and notes on how to convert these to other games systems
 36" x 48" full-color map of the western hemisphere of Kulthea

Publication history
Shadow World Master Atlas was written by Terry K. Amthor, with a cover by Tony Roberts, and illustrations by Jennell Jaquays, and was published by Iron Crown Enterprises in 1989 as boxed set containing two 64-page books, a 32-page book, and a large color map.

A number of different editions were produced, including a second edition by I.C.E. in 1992, a third edition by Eidolon Studios in 2001, and a 4th edition by I.C.E. in 2008.

Reception
In the August 1989 edition of Games International (Issue #8), Steve Jones admired the production quality of the boxed set, including the "beautiful cover art" by Terry Roberts. However Jones pointed out several errors in layout as well as illegible tables and missing information, saying, "The whole product shows signs of having been rushed into production." He also mentioned that "Various pieces have been taken from previous I.C.E. publications, which may leave those who already have them feeling cheated." Jones concluded by giving the product an average rating of 3 out of 5, and questioned the necessity of this product, saying, "It is useful for monsters, but a Rolemaster referee with [the previously published] Creatures and Treasures could just as well go straight to the [separately published] adventures packs instead."

Other reviews
White Wolf #17 (1989)
Pyramid - Third Edition

Notes

References

Role-playing game supplements introduced in 1989
Rolemaster supplements
Shadow World (role-playing game)